The Mullans represented Ireland in the 1999 Eurovision Song Contest in Jerusalem with the song "When You Need Me".

Before Eurovision

Eurosong 1999 
Eurosong 1999 was the national final format developed by RTÉ in order to select Ireland's entry for the Eurovision Song Contest 1999. The competition was held at the RTÉ Television Centre in Dublin on 7 March 1999 and hosted by Pat Kenny. Eight artists and songs were selected to compete which were presented on 9 January 1999 on the RTÉ programme Kenny Live. Regional televoting determined the winner and after the combination of votes, "When You Need Me" performed by the Mullans was selected as the winner.

At Eurovision
The Mullans performed 17th in the running order on the night of the contest, a draw on which three previous Irish entries had won ("What's Another Year?" in 1980, "Why Me?" in 1992 and "The Voice" in 1996). Despite taking an early lead with twelve points from the first voting country Lithuania, "When You Need Me" picked up only six additional points, finishing in 17th place.

Voting

References

1999
Countries in the Eurovision Song Contest 1999
Eurovision
Eurovision